Dangun was the legendary founder of Gojoseon.

Dangun may also refer to:
 Dan-Gun Hyung, a hyung in Taekwon-Do

See also
 Dangun Feveron, a video game
 Dangun years in the Korean calendar
 List of Korean monarchs